Bert Elmer Singleton (June 26, 1918 – January 5, 1996) was an American professional baseball player. The right-handed pitcher played all or part of seven seasons in Major League Baseball spread over 15 years (between 1945 and 1959) for the Boston Braves,  Pittsburgh Pirates, Washington Senators and Chicago Cubs. His professional career spanned 24 seasons, from 1940 until 1963, missing only 1944 due to voluntary retirement during World War II.

Singleton worked in 145 games pitched in the big leagues, including 19 as a starter, putting up a record of 11–17 and earned run average of 4.83. He allowed 322 hits and 146 bases on balls, with 160 strikeouts, in 327 innings pitched. He registered two complete games.

He also was part of a notable trade on September 30, 1946, when he was shipped by the Braves to the Pirates in a six-player deal that brought third baseman Bob Elliott to Boston.  Elliott would be chosen winner of the National League's 1947 Most Valuable Player Award and lead the Braves to the 1948 NL pennant.

His lengthy minor-league career included 14 seasons in the top-level Pacific Coast League. Singleton appeared in 526 minor-league games overall, and registered 184 career wins (against 186 losses).

References

External links

 

1918 births
1996 deaths
Baseball players from Utah
Boston Braves players
Chicago Cubs players
Fort Worth Cats players
Idaho Falls Russets players
Indianapolis Indians players
Kansas City Blues (baseball) players
Major League Baseball pitchers
Newark Bears (IL) players
Oklahoma City Indians players
Pittsburgh Pirates players
Portland Beavers players
Sacramento Solons players
San Francisco Seals (baseball) players
Seattle Rainiers players
Spokane Indians players
Sportspeople from Ogden, Utah
Toronto Maple Leafs (International League) players
Vancouver Mounties players
Washington Senators (1901–1960) players
Wenatchee Chiefs players